Mahesh Rawat (born 25 October 1985) is an Indian cricketer who is also the captain of Indian Railways cricket team. He played with Rajasthan Royals and was part of the Pune Warriors India team in the Indian Premier League.

He was the leading run-scorer for Railways in the 2018–19 Ranji Trophy, with 478 runs in seven matches.

References

External links
 Mahesh Rawat, profile at Cricinfo

Indian cricketers
1985 births
Living people
People from Faridabad
Rajasthan Royals cricketers
Haryana cricketers
Railways cricketers
Central Zone cricketers
Pune Warriors India cricketers
India Red cricketers
North Zone cricketers
Cricketers from Haryana
Wicket-keepers